The A14 is a side road of the A1 road and A30 road from Orapa Game Park to Palapye, bypassing Serowe, the seventh largest town in Botswana. It runs past Khama Rhino Sanctuary.

References

Roads in Botswana